Ronnie Burgess (March 7, 1963 – January 4, 2021) was an American professional football player who was a defensive back for the Green Bay Packers of the National Football League (NFL). He played college football for the Wake Forest Demon Deacons.

Biography
Burgess was born on March 7, 1963, in Sumter, South Carolina, and was a graduate of Sumter High School. He died on January 4, 2021, in Socastee, South Carolina, after a cardiac arrest related to medical issues stemming from a car accident in late 2019. He was 57 years old.

Career
Burgess played college football at Wake Forest University and was drafted by the Green Bay Packers in the tenth round of the 1985 NFL Draft. He played seven games for the Packers in 1985 and retired after that season.

After football
Burgess served as an assistant principal at Carolina Forest High School, and was a long-time administrator with Horry County Schools, having previously served as principal of Myrtle Beach High School, St. James High School, and the Academy for the Arts, Science and Technology.

See also
List of Green Bay Packers players

References

1963 births
2021 deaths
Sportspeople from Sumter, South Carolina
Players of American football from South Carolina
Green Bay Packers players
American football defensive backs
Wake Forest University alumni
Wake Forest Demon Deacons football players
Educators from South Carolina